Francisco Sanz (31 May 1942 – 15 May 2020) was a Spanish sports shooter. He competed in two events at the 1992 Summer Olympics.

References

1942 births
2020 deaths
Spanish male sport shooters
Olympic shooters of Spain
Shooters at the 1992 Summer Olympics
Place of birth missing
20th-century Spanish people